The Master is a 2009 Turkish drama film, directed by Bahadır Karataş, starring Yetkin Dikinciler as a small town car mechanic in who builds a small biplane in his backyard.

Production 
The film was shot on location in Eskişehir, Turkey.

Plot 
Dogan, a car mechanic in a small town, is obsessed with flying. He has been building a small biplane in his back yard for years. His wife Emine does not share his affinity for aviation and feels neglected in their marriage. When Dogan's plane crashes during an aeronautics fair, she gives him an ultimatum: he can either pursue his passion for flying or live a humble life with her, solely as a car mechanic.

See also 
 2009 in film
 Turkish films of 2009

References

External links
  
 

2009 films
2009 drama films
Turkish aviation films
Films set in Turkey
Turkish drama films
2000s Turkish-language films